John Meier may refer to: 
John Meier (folklorist) (1864–1953), German philologist and ethnographer
John Meier (politician) (born 1946), Australian politician
John H. Meier (born 1933), American associate of Howard Hughes involved in the Watergate Scandal
John P. Meier (1942–2022), American Biblical scholar and Catholic priest

See also
John Mayer (disambiguation)
John Meyer (disambiguation)